Bojan Hodak (born 4 May 1971) is a Croatian professional football coach and former player. He is the coach of Malaysia Super League club Kuala Lumpur City.

Early life 
Hodak was born and raised in Zagreb, Croatia, as the second child in a family with a strong military background. His father and brother were both army officers there. In his early years he spent most time playing basketball and football, not preferring one from the other as he excelled in both. There was neither a prominent figure that encouraged him, nor was there any history of sportsmen in his family, but Hodak carried on for fun, joining his friends. However at the age of 16, his local club NK Trnje began paying him for his services and he duly gave up basketball to focus his time and energy in football.

Managerial career

UPB-MyTeam 
Hodak's coaching career began in Malaysia in 2006 with the now-defunct UPB-MyTeam, where he guided them to promotion into the Malaysian Super League. There he was responsible for the development of UPB-MyTeam's very young squad, which produced many Malaysian national players, including Norshahrul Idlan Talaha, Shakir Shaari, Bunyamin Umar, Syed Adney Syed Hussein, Stanley Samuel, Azmi Muslim, Nazrin Nawi and Azamuddin Akil.

Phnom Penh Crown 
With Phnom Penh Crown, he won the Cambodian League and qualified for the AFC President's Cup Final Round for the first time in Cambodian football history.

Shandong Taishan 
With Shandong Taishan, he won the Reserve CSL and he was assistant coach in the First team that lost the Chinese FA Cup final 2–1 to Tianjin Teda.

Kelantan 
Hodak was appointed manager and head coach of Kelantan in February 2012. He made Kelantan history during his debut season, guiding them to a historic treble of the Malaysian FA Cup, Malaysian Super League and Malaysia Cup. The team also qualified for the 2012 AFC Cup quarter-finals where they lost to Arbil FC of Iraq, 3–6 on aggregate. In his second season with Kelantan, despite losing six key players, the team managed to retain the FA Cup, but lost the league championship to LionsXII and Malaysia Cup final to Sri Pahang. He left the team after the conclusion of the 2013 season.

Johor Darul Takzim 
With Johor Darul Ta'zim, he won the 2014 Malaysia Super League and qualified for the AFC Cup. The team collected 44 points from 22 matches and beat Sarawak 1–0 at Stadium Negeri Sarawak, Kuching. In January 2015, he guided JDT to the Charity Shield after JDT beat Pahang 2-0.

Penang 
Hodak was appointed CEO of Penang in May 2016 with the target to save Penang from relegation. Penang were bottom of the Malaysian Super League with only 6 points from 11 matches. He signed Nenad Baćina as head coach, changed three players and the team started improving. In the second half of the season, Penang was one of the best teams, winning 16 points, with only Johor Darul Ta'zim and Kedah Darul Aman winning more points in these 11 matches.

The team managed to stay in Malaysian Super League in 2016. After Hodak left at the end of the 2016 season, Penang was relegated the next season, after collecting only 12 points From 22 matches.

Malaysia U19 National Team 
With Malaysia U-19, Hodak achieved best results in the history by winning AFF U-19 Championship in 2018.
Before that, in 2017 he was runner Up in same age group and manage to qualify for AFC U-19 Championship 2017.

PSM Makassar 
On the last day of 2019 (31 December 2019), PSM Makassar officially announced Bojan Hodak as their new coach for the upcoming 2020 season.

Kuala Lumpur City 

Bojan helped the City Boys reached their first cup final after 22 years (since 1999 Malaysia FA Cup).

On top of that, Kuala Lumpur City put an end to the 32-year drought of Malaysia Cup (last won in 1989) by winning the 2021 Malaysia Cup final by beating the overwhelming favourites JDT 2–0 at the Bukit Jalil National Stadium.

As title holders of the Malaysia Cup, Kuala Lumpur City qualified to play in the 2022 AFC cup campaign via cup competition after Malaysia FA Cup was abandoned due to COVID-19 pandemic.

Honours 

 UPB MyTeam
 Malaysia Premier League promotion: 2007

 Phnom Penh Crown
 Cambodian League: 2011

 Kelantan
 Malaysia Super League: 2012
 Malaysia FA Cup: 2012, 2013
 Malaysia Cup: 2012; runner-up 2013

 Johor Darul Ta'zim
 Malaysia Super League: 2014
 Malaysia Charity Shield: 2015
 Malaysia Cup runner-up: 2014

 Malaysia National Team U19
 2017 AFF U-18 Youth Championship runner-up: 2017
 2018 AFF U-19 Youth Championship: 2018

 Kuala Lumpur City
 Malaysia Cup: 2021
 AFC Cup runner-up: 2022

Managerial stats

References 

1971 births
Living people
Footballers from Zagreb
Association football central defenders
Croatian footballers
NK Vrapče players
NK Hrvatski Dragovoljac players
Balestier Khalsa FC players
Jurong FC players
Hong Kong Rangers FC players
Croatian expatriate footballers
Expatriate footballers in Singapore
Croatian expatriate sportspeople in Singapore
Expatriate footballers in Hong Kong
Croatian expatriate sportspeople in Hong Kong
Singapore Premier League players
Croatian football managers
Phnom Penh Crown FC managers
Kelantan FA managers
PSM Makassar managers
Kuala Lumpur City F.C. managers
Croatian expatriate football managers
Expatriate football managers in Malaysia
Croatian expatriate sportspeople in Malaysia
Expatriate football managers in Cambodia
Expatriate football managers in Indonesia
Croatian expatriate sportspeople in Indonesia